Derbyshire Building Society (previously trading as The Derbyshire) was a UK building society based in Duffield, Derbyshire in the East Midlands of England. It was the 9th largest building society in the United Kingdom based on total assets of £7.1 billion at 31 December 2007, until it was acquired by Nationwide Building Society on 1 December 2008. It operated as a trading division of the society, with 50 branches, until it was fully integrated into its parent in November 2014.

History 

In January 1847, The Derby Building and Investment Society was formed, with an initial £120 shares offered; this was a terminating society which, having achieved its purpose a year ahead of schedule, was wound up in May 1859.

One of the Directors, Samuel Whitaker, decided to invite a group of business friends to a meeting on 12 August 1859 to discuss the preliminary arrangements for the formation of a permanent society. An immediate decision was taken and on 1 September 1859, the rules of The Derbyshire Permanent Building, Investment and Land Society were registered. Rev Gervase Wright was appointed the Chairman and Samuel Whitaker became the first secretary of the society, which was based at the offices of S Whitaker & Sons at 14 Iron Gate, Derby.

The first subscriptions were received on 15 September 1859 and the society was advertised for the first time in The Derby Mercury on 21 September 1859. In December 1859, the first advance was made to Mr Richard Ashby for £50.

From the start the society flourished largely due to the efforts of both the Chairman Rev. Gervase Wright and the Secretary Samuel Whitaker, with additional regular subscription meetings being held in Ripley and Matlock by early 1860, such that by December 1860 there were 456 members and 41 advances of over £6,000.

In early 1870, the society's assets had grown to £56,000 and the need for larger premises lead to the offices moving to 4 Victoria Street, Derby, where it remained for many years. By 1876, the society's assets had grown to £123,700, though the industrial depression which lasted for the next decade, affected the society's further growth.

In 1893, the society's Head Offices moved offices to 2 Victoria Street, Derby and in 1896 the society changed its name to "The Derbyshire Permanent Benefit Building Society".

By 1900, there were 2,286 building societies in Great Britain with combined assets of £59 million, only 3 of which had assets of more than £250,000. By that time, the society's assets stood at £188,000, making the society one of the largest in the country.

In 1966, the society merged with the Ashbourne Permanent Benefit Building Society and the Somercotes Building Society. The Somercotes society may have been based in the Derbyshire village of Somercotes (Alfreton, Amber Valley) where the society has a branch in Leabrooks Road. It also absorbed the Ilkeston Permanent Building Society in 2001.

In 2007 the society was rebranded with a new logo containing the Peak District Millstone, and a change of the trading name from "The Derbyshire" to the legal name of "Derbyshire Building Society". The new identity incorporated new signage for all branches and replacement passbooks and cashcards for members.

On 8 September 2008 it was announced that the Derbyshire, along with the Cheshire Building Society, had agreed to a merger with the Nationwide Building Society, the largest such institution. The merger was borne out of increasing fears about the financial security of both the Derbyshire and the Cheshire societies with the former expected to post half-yearly losses of £17 million and the latter posting losses of £10.5 million. As a result of these projected losses no windfall payments were made to the savers of the smaller societies. Unusually there was no vote amongst members as to this proposition, after a special resolution under the Building Societies Act enabling a faster merger. The deal was concluded on 1 December 2008 following agreement by the Financial Services Authority and the Office of Fair Trading. Upon completion of the merger, the society's logo was again changed, this time removing the Peak District millstone image.

In May 2013, it was announced that the Derbyshire, Cheshire and Dunfermline brands would be phased out over two years, and branches either rebranded under the Nationwide brand or closed.

See also
Derbyshire Group Staff Union

References

External links 
Derbyshire Building Society
Building Societies Association
KPMG Building Societies Database 2008

Banks established in 1859
Economy of Derby
Companies based in Derbyshire